Nandikeswarapuram is a village in Eluru district of the Indian state of Andhra Pradesh. It is located in Pedapadu mandal of Eluru revenue division.

Demographics 

 Census of India, Nandikeswarapuram had a population of 212. The total population constitute, 104  males and 108 females with a sex ratio of 1328 females per 1000 males. 28 children are in the age group of 0–6 years with sex ratio of 1000. The average literacy rate stands at 67.93%.

References 

Villages in Eluru district